Agathia succedanea is a species of moth of the family Geometridae first described by William Warren in 1897. It is found on Borneo and Sumatra.

References

Geometrinae
Moths of Asia